David Reginald Nightingale (15 August 1927 – 2013) was an English footballer, who played as a full back in the Football League for Tranmere Rovers. He died in Adelaide, Australia in 2013.

References

1927 births
2013 deaths
Association football fullbacks
English Football League players
English footballers
Tranmere Rovers F.C. players